Francesco Megale (3 March 1615 – 4 November 1681) was a Roman Catholic prelate who served as Bishop of Isola (1679–1681).

Biography
Francesco Megale was born in San Mauro Marchesato, Italy on 3 March 1615. On 27 November 1679, he was appointed during the papacy of Pope Innocent XI as Bishop of Isola. On 30 November 1679, he was consecrated bishop by Alessandro Crescenzi (cardinal), Bishop of Recanati e Loreto, with Prospero Bottini, Titular Archbishop of Myra, and Pier Antonio Capobianco, Bishop Emeritus of Lacedonia, serving as co-consecrators. He served as Bishop of Isola until his death on 4 November 1681.

References

External links and additional sources
 (for Chronology of Bishops) 
 (for Chronology of Bishops)  

17th-century Italian Roman Catholic bishops
People from the Province of Crotone
Bishops appointed by Pope Innocent XI
1615 births
1681 deaths